Alberuela de Tubo is a municipality located in the province of Huesca, Aragon, Spain. According to the 2009 census (INE), the municipality has a population of 358 inhabitants.

Villages
Sodeto, created by the IRYDA in lands formerly belonging to the Duke of Villahermosa.

References 

Municipalities in the Province of Huesca